Nothing Funny is a 1995 Polish drama film directed by Marek Koterski. It is the third in a nine-part series of films about the character Adaś Miauczyński, created by Koterski. Each story showcases a different aspect or era of his life, often with little continuity between them.

Synopsis
In this period of his life, Adaś Miauczyński is a bumbling film director. A graduate of the Łódź Film School, Miauczyński feels professionally and personally unfulfilled. His career path has been marked by failure, and his first film is a flop. His continued search for the woman of his life proves futile, something he is reminded of each time his work colleague Maciej sleeps with a woman Miauczyński goes on a date with. When his ex-wife, Beata, with whom he still lives but who despises him, together with their daughter, orchestrates a mock kidnapping and execution, Miauczyński suffers a fatal heart attack. The story is presented from the perspective of his corpse lying on a table at the morgue, "reminiscing" about his life.

Cast and characters
 Cezary Pazura as Adaś Miauczyński
 Maciej Kozłowski as Maciej
 Marek Kondrat as the film director
 Ewa Błaszczyk as Beata Miauczynska
 Agnieszka Wagner as Adam's mother
 Henryk Bista as the pyrotechnician
 Jerzy Bończak as the technician
 Krzysztof Kowalewski  as the producer

References

External links
 

1995 drama films
1995 films
Polish drama films